A list of films produced in Italy in 1931 (see 1931 in film):

See also
List of Italian films of 1930
List of Italian films of 1932

References

External links
Italian films of 1931 at the Internet Movie Database

Italian
1931
Films